Desch is a surname. Notable people with the surname include:

August Desch (1898–1964), American hurdler
Joseph Desch (1907–1987), American engineer and cryptologist
Madison Desch (born 1997), American artistic gymnast

See also
Desch, a character in Final Fantasy III

German-language surnames